The substantive and procedural laws of Cuba were later based on the Spanish Civil laws and were influenced by the principles of Marxism-Leninism after that philosophy became the guiding force of government.  The most recent Constitution of Cuba was enacted in 2019.

Principle of equality 
Cuban law is dedicated to advancing equality among the Cuban population, according to state sources.

The Family Code

The Family Code covers marriage, divorce, marital property relationships, recognition of children, obligations for children’s care and education, adoption, and tutelage. The following are Clauses 24, 25, 26, 27, and 28 of the Cuban Family Code:

24. Marriage is constituted on the basis of equal rights and duties of both partners.

25. The spouses must share the same home, be faithful to one another, help, consider and respect each other. The rights and duties established by this code will subsist in their entirety as long as the marriage has not been legally terminated, in spite of the fact that for justifiable reasons a common household cannot be maintained.

26. Both spouses are obligated to care for the family they have created and cooperate with each other in the education, formation and guidance of their children in line with the principles of socialist morality. As well, each to the extent of his or her capabilities and possibilities must participate in governing the home and cooperate toward its best possible care.

27. The spouses are obligated to contribute toward satisfying the needs of faculties and economic capacities. Nevertheless, if one of the spouses contributes only through his or her work in the home and child-care, the other spouse must provide full economic support without this meaning that he or she be relieved of the obligations of cooperating with the housework and child-care.

28. Both spouses have the right to exercise their professions or crafts and must lend each other reciprocal cooperation and aid to this effect, as well as in order to carry out studies or perfect their training, but in all cases they will take care to organize their home life so that such activities be coordinated with fulfillment of the obligations imposed by this code.”

The Cuban people began to discuss the Family Code in the early 1974; they wanted the Family code to become law in time for the FMC Congress. Aside of this fact, the Family Code was so important to the Cuban people that they deemed it vital to have a complete and “far reaching” discussion about it. People as young as junior high school students got enthusiastically interested in the Code, and had debates and discussions about it as the first law to have tremendous importance to their future. The plan for the discussion of the code was announced by Blas Roca at the Women’s Congress. Roca was a very active member of the Orthodox party. And by then he was Secretariat and head of the committee to draft new laws. He is now the president of the national People’s Assembly.   The Family Code was very important to the Cuban people at the time of its implementation into the Cuban Law books. Like all of Cuba’s most important laws, the Family Code had been published in a tabloid edition in order for it to reach everybody in Cuba; virtually every man, woman, and young person who wanted to read and study it could have access to it. Cuban people are able to quickly master the new code in meetings through the trade unions, the CDRs, the FMC, the schools, and so on. Because most Cuban citizens attend more than one of these meetings, people take multiple advantages to learn and discuss the code until they digest all the information they need to know about it point by point. Because the government wanted to ensure the Code favors all and not some, people were encouraged at these meetings to ask questions and suggest additions, amendments, and or deletions.  “The way this process works is that a record is kept of each meeting, the results are sent through the respective organizations to their highest level, where they are tabulated, computed, and turned over to the original committee (adjacent, at the time, to the party’s Central Committee, now adjacent to the National Assembly).”  The Family Code was officially given to the Cuban people on March 8, 1975, which marks International Women’s Day in Cuba.

Substantive and procedural law

Criminal law
Cuba's criminal code was based on Spanish law until 1956

Controversial portions of Cuba's criminal code include vague provisions providing for the arrest of persons committing anti-revolutionary acts.

Cuban Criminal Code however does not cover international i

Private property

Cuban law regarding private property has been heavily criticized as offering little to no protection to private property.

In 1992, in response to the Special Period, the Cuban constitution was changed to authorize the limited existence of joint ventures and corporations.

Cuba law also permits the collective ownership of agricultural cooperatives.

In 2010, Cuban leaders Fidel and Raul Castro made the decision to abandon the old Soviet model of centralized planning. In 2011, new laws where enacted to expand the right to private property. In 2019, a new Constitution was approved which officially recognizes the right to private property, while also reassuring the central government's authority over the regulation of production and land.

Economic regulation
Cuba's laws provide for strong government regulation of the economy in almost all of its facets.

History

Pre-1959 legal history 
Cuba was a colony of Spain until its independence was won in 1899, following military intervention by the United States (known in the United States as the Spanish–American War). Following the defeat of the Spanish, Cuba remained under a US military government until 1902, at which time the US oversaw the creation of a new government. The Diario de sesiones del Congreso de la Republica de Cuba (Daily sessions of the Congress of the Republic of Cuba) show how Cuban law was shaped during this period.

The influence of both United States and Spanish rule on Cuban Law were present decades into the future. For example, the Spanish Penal Code influenced the 1936 Civil Defense Code of Cuba, which remained in effect until 1979. The Spanish Civil Code of 1889 remained in effect (although modified) until 1987. The influence of the United States appeared in the form of a supreme court of appeals and judicial review.

Revolutionary period (1959–mid-1970s)

Major laws and changes 
Following the triumph of  Cuban Revolution on January 1, 1959, much of the Constitution of 1940 was reinstated. This did not fulfill the promises in the Manifesto of Montecristi, however, since Castro's government did not restore the constitution in total and failed to call elections within the 18-month period that the manifesto required.

In the aftermath of the Revolution, the Congress was supplanted by a Council of Ministers, consolidating greater power in the hands of the revolutionary government. In the years to follow, the revolutionary government enacted hundreds of laws and decrees with the aim of affecting basic change in Cuba's socio-economic system. Some of the major laws enacted include the First Agrarian Reform Law of May 1959, Urban Reform Law of October 1960, Nationalization Law of October 1960, Nationalization of Education Law of June 1961, and the Second Agrarian Reform Law of October 1963. Furthermore, new institutions, such as the National Institute of Agrarian Reform (INRA), were created to carry out these laws more efficiently.

Revolutionary courts 
In February 1962, 45 Cuban Air Force officers were tried for genocide in the civilian courts and were acquitted. Their acquittal was publicly denounced by Fidel Castro as a miscarriage of justice. In response to the verdict, the Revolutionary Government established "Revolutionary Courts," whose purpose was to try those accused of collaboration with the deposed Batista regime, especially those accused of torture and assassination, and those engaged in counterrevolutionary activity. These courts were criticized for their summary procedures, which limited a defendant's ability to prepare for trial, as well as procedural safeguards, such as the right to appeal a verdict of guilt. It has been noted the effect of the courts was to produce a fast, certain, and severe result. In all, hundreds of individuals were found guilty in these proceedings and subsequently executed. Hostility toward the Batista regime led to widespread acceptance of these courts by the Cuban people. Supporters of the Revolutionary Courts note that their institution may have prevented "mob justice," as had been seen following other periods of revolution and social unrest.

People's popular courts 
In the early 1960s, People's Popular Courts were set up, whose goal, according to Fidel Castro, was to correct anti-social behavior "not with sanctions, in the traditional style, but rather with measures that would have a profound educational spirit." First established in the rural areas of the country, there were more than 2,200 such courts by the end of the 1960s. The proceedings of these courts were opened to the public in an effort to maximize their effect. These courts were criticized for overlapping with the jurisdiction of other courts and for their inconsistent application of the law.

Institutionalization (mid-1970s–late 1980s)

Need for new legal system 
As the 1960s drew to a close, the most radical phase of the revolution had passed and internal counter-revolution had been suppressed. The Cuban government sought to institutionalize the Revolution. Key to this was the creation of a new legal system.

1973 Reforms 
In 1973, the Cuban Council of Ministers approved a structure for the new legal system, abolishing the People's Popular Courts and the Revolutionary Courts. In the place of the old legal system, a court system was established with four levels of jurisdiction: Base, District, Provincial, and National (Supreme Court). The Supreme Court was given appellate jurisdiction over four distinct areas of law: civil/administrative, criminal, state security, and military. The reforms of 1973 also saw the end of private legal practice, and all lawyers who continued to provide legal services were required to join legal collectives, known as bufetes colectivos. Also included in the reforms was the creation of "lay judges," who served on the bench alongside professional judges and kept alive the popular spirit of the People's Courts. These reforms were criticized on the basis that many judges appointed to serve on these courts were incompetent and that the courts were not administered well.

Constitution of 1976 and socialist legality 
In 1976, Cuba formally institutionalized the revolution with the adoption of a new Constitution, which provided the legal system be based on the principle of socialist legality. In constructing their legal system, Cuba looked to the countries of the Socialist Bloc for blueprints. The principle of socialist legality, as articulated by Cuban jurists, puts forth that the role of the law in a socialist society is to create social stability while simultaneously furthering the development of the socialist society through change in Cuban political culture. As a guiding principle, socialist legality is explicitly transformative—its stated purpose is to transform society. This transformative principle penetrates to the heart of the law and has guided the development of Cuban Law since the mid-1970s. The explicit transformative principle of socialist legality sets it apart from the civil law and the common law legal systems, whose underlying principles are based on existing statute and custom, respectively.

Subsequent reforms 
Successive reforms were instituted throughout the next 30 years to increase the autonomy of bufetes colectivos and the courts, adapt the courts to changing circumstances in Cuba, and to remedy other administrative problems that plagued the legal system.

Recent legal history (late 1980s–present)

Collapse of the Eastern Bloc 
In the late 1980s, with the downfall of the Soviet Union, starting with the pulling down of the Berlin wall in 1989 and its full collapse in 1991, the laws of Cuba changed again to respond to the new conditions of the Special Period. The Constitutional amendments of 1992 recognized forms of non-socialist property (joint ventures, corporations, other economic associations) and provided for non-discrimination based on religious belief (for example, persons with religious belief may now join the Cuban Communist Party, although Cuban Priests have commented this is merely a 'token' gesture, and in reality, the ability of religious persons to join the Party is limited and fraught with difficulty). Popular participation in government was expanded with the direct election of National and Provincial assemblies. It is these changes that signify Cuba's abandonment of the Soviet legal model.

2002 Constitutional amendments 
In 2002, the Constitution was again amended to make the socialist system permanent and irrevocable. This came at a time when the Varela Project called for greater political freedom in Cuba.

Creation of private property rights 
On April 18, 2011, the Sixth Cuban Congress approved laws expanding the internal market and access to global markets. In February 2019, voters approved a new Constitution granting right to private property and greater access to free markets, while also maintaining Cuba's status as a socialist state

2019 Constitution 
On 24 February 2019, voters approved a new constitution which included reforms such as:
 The recognition of private property, and the creation of a freer market;
 The restoration of the positions of President and Prime Minister of Cuba as posts separate from President of the Council of State and of Ministers;
 The transfer of head of Council of State to the President of the National Assembly
 The position of mayor being added to that of president of a municipal assembly
 The creation of a requirement for Presidential-appointed Provincial Governors and Deputy Governors to be ratified by local municipal governments 
 The acknowledgement of climate change and its threat
 The establishment of provincial councils made up of municipal leaders
 The creation of a two consecutive five-year term limit imposed on the president;
 Defining marriage as “a social and legal institution” and “one form of family organization.”
 Extending the terms of municipal council delegates to five years;
 Banning discrimination based on gender, race, ethnic origin, sexual orientation, gender identity or disability, (formerly included leading to the possible legalization of same-sex marriage); 
 The restoration of a presumption of innocence in the justice system, last provided for in the 1940 constitution.

The Constitution was afterwards proclaimed as scheduled on 10 April 2019. After being proclaimed, the Constitution was published in the Official Gazette of the Republic, ensuring its entry into force.

See also 

Constitution of Cuba 2002, English language version
Cuban Legal System
Legal Profession (Cuba)
Agrarian Reform Laws of Cuba
Cuban civil code

Footnotes

 Aviva Chomsky, Barry Carr, and Pamela Maria Smorkaloff, The Cuba Reader: History, Culture, Politics. Duke University Press, Durham and London. (2003)

References
Smith, Lois M., and Alfred Padula. Sex and Revolution: Women in Socialist Cuba. New York: Oxford University Press, 1996.

External links 
 https://www.gacetaoficial.gob.cu/ – The homepage of the Ministry of Justice. Cuban legislation from 2000 onwards is available here in Spanish.
 http://edis.ifas.ufl.edu/FE481 (Informative page on Agrarian Reform in Cuba after 1959)
 https://www.cubanet.org/ref/dis/const_92_e.htm  (Text of current Cuban Constitution).
 http://www.dloc.com/?b=UF00015180 (Diario de sesiones del Congreso de la Republica de Cuba / Daily sessions of the Congress of the Republic of Cuba 1902–1957 freely available in the Digital Library of the Caribbean with full page images and full text)
 https://law.stanford.edu/wp-content/uploads/2017/10/Guide-to-Cuban-Law-and-Legal-Reseatch.pdf (GUIDE TO CUBAN LAW AND LEGAL RESEARCH, International Journal of Legal Information 45.2, 2017, pp. 76–188.)